Mathías Daniel Llontop Díaz (born 22 May 2002) is a Peruvian footballer who plays as a left back for USMP.

Career statistics

Club

Notes

References

2002 births
Living people
Peruvian footballers
Peru youth international footballers
Association football defenders
Footballers from Lima